is a railway station on the Takayama Main Line in the city of Hida, Gifu Prefecture, Japan, operated by Central Japan Railway Company (JR Central).

Lines

Station layout
Sakakami Station has one ground-level side platform and one ground-level island platform connected by a footbridge. The station is unattended.

Platforms

Adjacent stations

History
Sakakami Station opened on November 12, 1933. The station was absorbed into the JR Central network upon the privatization of the Japanese National Railways (JNR) on April 1, 1987.

Surrounding area
 Former Miyazawa Village Hall

See also
 List of Railway Stations in Japan

External links

Railway stations in Gifu Prefecture
Takayama Main Line
Railway stations in Japan opened in 1933
Stations of Central Japan Railway Company
Hida, Gifu